Bellecour may refer to:

Bellecour (actor), French actor
Madame Bellecour, French actress, his wife
Place Bellecour, a square in Lyon, France